After the Drama is the sixth and final album released by rap group, 11/5. It was released on September 11, 2001 for Dogday, Priority and Capitol Records and was produced by the three members of the group, Maine-O, TayDaTay and Hennessy.

Track listing
"After the Drama"- 3:56  
"Top Billin"- 4:02  
"Mob House"- 4:03  
"Destiny"- 3:18  
"On Tha Block"- 2:59  
"It's Nothin"- 3:37  
"Slowdown Baby"- 3:40  
"Who Am I?" feat. Maine-O – 3:13  
"Shot Calla"- 4:45  
"Smoke Signal"- 3:47  
"Guerilla Pimpin'"- 3:17  
"2-4-1"- 3:28  
"Block Buster"- 3:47

References

2001 albums
11/5 albums
Priority Records albums
Capitol Records albums